Murphy Lake is a lake in Berrien County, Michigan, United States.

The lake has the name of Isaac Murphy, a pioneer who settled at the lake in 1833.

See also
List of lakes in Michigan

References

Lakes of Michigan
Lakes of Berrien County, Michigan